Francis Teisseire (8 July 1917 – 23 November 1998) was an Australian cricketer. He played in one first-class match for South Australia in 1939/40.

See also
 List of South Australian representative cricketers

References

External links
 

1917 births
1998 deaths
Australian cricketers
South Australia cricketers
Cricketers from Adelaide